Simbari Khaleh (also Romanized as Sīmbarī Khāleh; also known as Sīmbar Khāleh and Sīmbar Khāleh-ye Pā’īn) is a village in Dinachal Rural District, Pareh Sar District, Rezvanshahr County, Gilan Province, Iran. At the 2006 census, its population was 517, in 112 families.

References 

Populated places in Rezvanshahr County